Artois, formerly known as Germantown, is a census-designated place in Glenn County, California, USA. It is located on the former United States Highway 99W, and is bypassed to the west by Interstate 5. It is served by the California Northern Railroad, formerly the west Sacramento Valley line of the Southern Pacific Railroad. Its coordinates are approximately 39°37' N 122°12' W.  The ZIP code for Artois is 95913. The community is inside area code 530. The population was 295 at the 2010 census.

History
The name stems from the ancient province in France where the method of boring artesian wells was first adopted.  Artois was formerly named Germantown, and petitions to change the Germantown post office name were successful with Artois adopted on May 21, 1918.  Local belief is that a World War I troop train stopped to water at Germantown and a riot ensued when the troops took offense at the name.  The town was then renamed after the Battles of Artois.

The Germantown post office opened in 1877, and changed its name to Artois in 1918.

On June 1, 2011, an EF1 tornado struck east of Artois, uprooting hundreds of almond trees, and causing damage to farm equipment and roofing materials.

The Lynching of Christian Mutschler

On May 4, 1878, blacksmith Christian Mutschler (also spelled Mutchler) and his friends John Kelley and Henry Holmes got into an argument with a saloon keeper named Hageman.  Mutschler, who was suspected of starting a fire in St. John, California the year before, was persuaded by Kelley and Holmes, along with W. Hagaman, F. Todt, Charles Hansen and Carl Regensberger to set a bag of shavings afire in the saloon.  A couple of cowboys having a drink witnessed Mutschler lighting the shavings and shot him in the leg. Mutschler was charged with arson by the Justice of the Peace, a man named Boardman.  Oddly, no charges were brought up on the cowboys.  No one would testify against Mutschler so Boardman released him.  Mutschler wasted no time in getting out of town, but the local stage was ordered not to let Mutschler ride. He started limping towards Orland, California in the hot sun.  Mutschler's friend, John Kelley swore out a complaint that Mutschler had threatened his life, and a deputy was sent up the road to arrest the hapless blacksmith.  Mutschler's bail was set at a thousand dollars, which he could not pay.  Because Germantown did not have a jail, Mutschler was put into the protective custody of Constable William McLane, the owner of another Germantown saloon, where the prisoner was kept during the night.  During the early morning hours of May 5, 1878, a group of twelve to fourteen masked men burst into the saloon and took Mutschler about a quarter of a mile away and shot him to death.  Mutschler's friends, Holmes, Kelley, Hansen, Regensberger and a man known as R. Radcliff were all arrested for the crime.  Their trial started on December 14, 1878, but was immediately dismissed due to missing witnesses.

Demographics

The 2010 United States Census reported that Artois had a population of 295. The racial makeup of Artois was 245 (83.1%) White, 0 (0.0%) African American, 8 (2.7%) Native American, 3 (1.0%) Asian, 0 (0.0%) Pacific Islander, 25 (8.5%) from other races, and 14 (4.7%) from two or more races. Hispanic or Latino of any race were 54 persons (18.3%).

The census reported that 295 people (100% of the population) lived in households, 0 (0%) lived in non-institutionalized group quarters, and 0 (0%) were institutionalized.

There were 101 households, of which 32 (31.7%) had children under the age of 18 living in them, 70 (69.3%) were opposite-sex married couples living together, 7 (6.9%) had a female householder with no husband present, 7 (6.9%) had a male householder with no wife present.  There were 4 (4.0%) unmarried opposite-sex partnerships, and 1 (1.0%) same-sex married couples or partnerships. 16 households (15.8%) were made up of individuals, and 6 (5.9%) had someone living alone who was 65 years of age or older. The average household size was 2.92.  There were 84 families (83.2% of all households); the average family size was 3.24.

77 people (26.1%) under the age of 18, 19 people (6.4%) aged 18 to 24, 77 people (26.1%) aged 25 to 44, 75 people (25.4%) aged 45 to 64, and 47 people (15.9%) who were 65 years of age or older. The median age was 40.4 years. For every 100 females, there were 102.1 males.  For every 100 females age 18 and over, there were 101.9 males.

The homeowner vacancy rate was 0%; the rental vacancy rate was 0%. 229 people (77.6% of the population) lived in owner-occupied housing units and 66 people (22.4%) lived in rental housing units.

Politics

Notable residents
Sue Ellen Wooldridge, former U.S. attorney

Weblinks

References

Census-designated places in Glenn County, California
Census-designated places in California